Erin Hawksworth is an anchor and reporter. She is a former sports anchor for Sportsnet and CNN International.

Hawksworth worked for KCPQ, the Fox affiliate in her hometown of Seattle as both a sports and morning news anchor and reporter. She also worked for WFXT, the Fox affiliate in Boston; WFAA in Dallas, Texas; and KJCT in Grand Junction, Colorado. Hawksworth got her start as an intern for NBC, covering the 2004 Summer Olympics in Athens, Greece. Hawksworth was also an intern in the sports department at KPNX in Phoenix, Arizona.

On August 20, 2015, Hawksworth joined Sinclair-owned ABC affiliate WJLA-TV in Washington, D.C., as its new sports anchor.

Filmography

Personal
Hawksworth grew up in Sammamish, Washington, where she attended both Eastlake High School and Skyline High School 
Her younger brother Blake was a pitcher for the St. Louis Cardinals and Los Angeles Dodgers.  Her grandfather Jack Poole, was the head of the VANOC bid committee that brought 2010 Winter Olympics to Vancouver, British Columbia. Bleacher Report named  Hawksworth among the 40 Most Popular Sports Reporters of 2013. Hawksworth is a Metis member of Cree descent through her grandfather Jack Poole. Erin had a baby in March of 2021 but has yet to publicly name the father of the child.

Education
Hawksworth graduated from the Walter Cronkite School of Journalism and Mass Communication, where she earned an academic scholarship at Arizona State University with a Bachelor of Arts degree in Journalism and Mass Communication. She attended both Skyline High School and Eastlake High School in Sammamish.

References

External links
Dallas Observer's Best Reason to Watch Another Boring Rangers Segment
WFXT Biography (archived 2010)

1981 births
Living people
Canadian television reporters and correspondents
People from Sammamish, Washington
Television anchors from Boston
Walter Cronkite School of Journalism and Mass Communication alumni